Borgo San Dalmazzo is a comune (municipality) in the Province of Cuneo in the Italian region Piedmont, located about  south of Turin and about  southwest of Cuneo.

Borgo San Dalmazzo takes its name from Saint Dalmatius of Pavia. Sights include the parish church of San Dalmazzo (11th century).
 
Borgo San Dalmazzo borders the following municipalities: Boves, Cuneo, Gaiola, Moiola, Roccasparvera, Roccavione, Valdieri, and Vignolo.

The Nazi and Italian Social Republic regimes established and operated the Borgo San Dalmazzo concentration camp during the Second World War. At Borgo, approximately 375 Jewish Italians (from Cuneo, Saluzzo, Mondovì and other nearby communes) and 349 Jewish refugees from other countries were imprisoned and eventually deported to Auschwitz and other Nazi extermination camps.

Twin towns — sister cities
Borgo San Dalmazzo is twinned with:

  Breil-sur-Roya, France 
  La Vega, Dominican Republic
  Valdeblore, France

References

External links